Teachers College, Columbia University (TC) is the graduate school of education of Columbia University, a private research university in New York City. Founded in 1887, Teachers College has served as one of the official faculties and the Department of Education of Columbia University since 1898 and is consistently ranked among the top 10 graduate schools of education in the United States (currently 7th as of 2022). It is the oldest and largest graduate school of education in the United States. Although it was founded as an independent institution and retains some independence, it has been associated with Columbia University since shortly after its founding and merger with the university.

Teachers College alumni and faculty have held prominent positions in academia, government, music, non-profit, healthcare, and social science research. Overall, Teachers College has over 90,000 alumni in more than 30 countries. Notable alumni and former faculty include John Dewey, Art Garfunkel, Dr. Ruth Westheimer (Dr. Ruth), Carl Rogers, Margaret Mead, Bill Campbell, Georgia O'Keeffe, Edward Thorndike, Rollo May, Donna Shalala, Albert Ellis, William Schuman (former president of the Juilliard School), Lee Huan (Premier of the Republic of China), Shirley Chisholm (first black woman elected to the United States Congress), Hafizullah Amin (leader of Afghanistan), Hamden L. Forkner (founder of Future Business Leaders of America), and E. Gordon Gee (has held more university presidencies than any other American including Brown University and Vanderbilt University).

History

Founding and early history 

Teachers College was the first graduate school in the United States whose curriculum focused specifically on teacher education. 

In 1880, the Kitchen Education Association (KEA) was founded by philanthropist Grace Hoadley Dodge, the daughter of wealthy businessman William Dodge. The association's focus was to replace miniature kitchen utensils for other toys that were age-appropriate for kindergarten-aged girls. In 1884, the KEA was rebranded to the Industrial Education Association (IEA), in the spirit of widening its mission to boys and parents. Three years later, it moved to the former Union Theological Seminary building on University Place, as well as founded a coeducational private school called the Horace Mann School.

In 1887 William Vanderbilt Jr. offered a substantial financial sum to the IEA.  With the support of Dodge, Vanderbilt appointed Nicholas Murray Butler, the future longest-serving president of Columbia University and Nobel Peace Prize recipient, as new president of the IEA. The IEA decided to provide schooling for the teachers of the poor children of New York City. Thus, in 1887–1888, it employed six instructors and enrolled 36 juniors in its inaugural class as well as 86 special students. To reflect the broadening mission of education beyond the original philanthropic intent set forth by Dodge, the IEA changed its name to the New York School for the Training of Teachers, and received its temporary charter from the New York State Board of Regents.

By October 1890, the school's trustees were looking for a new campus, as the University Place campus was considered too small. After discussion with Columbia University president Seth Low, the trustees settled on a site in Morningside Heights, near where Columbia's campus was being built. In 1892, the name of the New York School for the Training of Teachers was again changed to Teachers College. The next year, Teachers College and Columbia University were merged (affiliated) with each other, and the trustees acquired land for the new college campus in Morningside Heights. The buildings for the campus of the college were designed by William Appleton Potter. The first structure in the original complex, Main Hall, was completed in late 1894; the last, Milbank Memorial Hall, was finished three years later.

The curriculum combined a humanitarian concern to help others with a scientific approach to human development. The college was affiliated with Columbia University in 1898 as the university's Graduate School of Education. A new building for Horace Mann was erected in 1899, followed by the Frederick Ferris Thompson Memorial Hall in 1902–1904. Additionally, a four-wing dormitory building, called Whittier Hall, was built in 1900–1901. Enrollment increased quickly: the graduating class of 1911 contained 686 students, as opposed to the 26 students in the first graduating class.

Expansion of scope 

The founders early recognized that professional teachers need reliable knowledge about the conditions under which children learn most effectively. As a result, the college's program from the start included such fundamental subjects as educational psychology and educational sociology. The founders also insisted that education must be combined with clear ideas about ethics and the nature of a good society; consequently, programs were developed in the history of education and in comparative education.

As the number of school children increased during the twentieth century, the problems of managing the schools became ever more complex. The college took on the challenge and instituted programs of study in areas of administration, economics, and politics. Other programs developed in such emerging fields as clinical and counseling psychology, organizational psychology, developmental psychology, cognitive psychology, curriculum development, instructional technology, media studies, and school health care.

Teachers College, Columbia University, was also associated with philosopher and public intellectual John Dewey, who served as president of the American Psychological Association and the American Philosophical Association, and was a professor at the facility from 1904 until his retirement in 1930.

Presidents

Academics

The school offers Master of Arts (M.A.), Master of Education (Ed.M.), Master of Science (M.S.), Doctor of Education (Ed.D.), and Doctor of Philosophy (PhD) degrees in over sixty programs of study. Despite the college's name, less than one-third of students are preparing to become teachers. Graduates pursue careers, for example, in the social sciences, health and health promotion, educational policy, technology, international and comparative education, as well as educational leadership. The college's Counseling Psychology Ed.M. is accredited by the Masters in Psychology and Counseling Accreditation Council (MPCAC).

According to Teachers College former president Susan Fuhrman, the college provides solutions to the difficult problems of urban education, reaffirming its original mission in providing a new kind of education for those left most in need by society or circumstance. The college continues its collaborative research with urban and suburban school systems that strengthen teaching in such fundamental areas as reading, writing, science, mathematics, and the arts; prepares leaders to develop and administer psychological and health care programs in schools, businesses, hospitals and community agencies; and advances technology for the classroom, developing new teaching software and keeping teachers abreast of new developments.

 
Teachers College also houses a wide range of applied psychology degrees, including one of the nation's leading programs in organizational psychology. Every year captains from the United States Military Academy at West Point are selected for the Eisenhower Leader Development Program (ELDP) and complete the Organizational Psychology M.A. program to become tactical officers (TAC) at West Point.

The college also houses the programs in anthropology. It was foundational in the development of the field of anthropology and education. By the 1930s, Teachers College had begun to offer courses in anthropology as part of the foundations of education. By 1948 Margaret Mead started what would be a long association with Teachers College where she taught until the early 1970s. In 1953 Solon Kimball joined the faculty. In 1954 nine professors (including Mead and Solon Kimball) came together to discuss the topic. In the 1960s, these people formed the Council on Anthropology and Education within the American Anthropological Association, and it is still considered as the leading organization in the field.

The student experience at Teachers College is governed by a student senate, headed by the Senate president, followed by the vice-president, parliamentarian, communications officer, and treasurer. Two senators, a master's candidate, and a PhD candidate are elected each year to represent each academic department at Teachers College to advocate on behalf of current students and alumni. The TC Senate meets bi-weekly to determine what issues need to be investigated.

Academic departments 

Arts & Humanities
Biobehavioral Sciences
Counseling & Clinical Psychology
Curriculum & Teaching
Education Policy & Social Analysis
Health & Behavioral Studies
Human Development
International & Transcultural Studies
Mathematics, Science & Technology
Organization & Leadership

Rankings
For 2023, U.S. News & World Report ranked Teachers College, Columbia University, No. 7 among all graduate schools of education in the United States.

In 2008, 2002, 1998, 1997, and 1996 Teachers College, Columbia University, was ranked first by the publication.

Teachers College, Columbia University, was ranked #2 in Curriculum and Instruction in 2023 according to U.S. News & World Report.

Admissions are highly selective.

Relationship with Columbia University

Teachers College serves as Columbia University's graduate and professional school of education by virtue of its designation as the university's Faculty and Department of Education. However, the college holds its own corporate status, including an independent administrative structure, board of trustees and endowment.

Teachers College graduates are awarded Columbia University degrees. Teachers College is statutorily prohibited from conferring its own degrees. Although the college houses PhD programs, these degrees are conferred by Columbia University's Graduate School of Arts and Sciences in a manner analogous to the PhD programs of the university's other professional schools.

Teachers College's graduating class participates in the Columbia University Commencement ceremony. TC graduates are Columbia University alumni, may attend Columbia Alumni Association events, retain their @columbia.edu email for life, and are eligible for nomination of the alumni medal and membership to the Columbia University Club of New York.

While Teachers College faculty appointments are approved by Teachers College's board of trustees at the discretion of the president of Columbia University, "Columbia University [has] no responsibility for salaries, tenure, or retirement allowances" of officers of Teachers College.

Teachers College shares academic and institutional resources with greater Columbia University including courses of instruction (Teachers College students may take courses at any other Columbia University graduate school and vice versa), libraries, health service systems, research centers, classrooms, special event facilities and the Dodge Fitness Center.

The Ivy League will allow Columbia fourth-year senior student-athletes, who may have lost playing time due to COVID-19-related cancellations in their final year of eligibility, to continue playing their varsity sport for the 2021–22 season if they are accepted to and enroll at Teachers College.

The Columbia University Senate includes faculty and student representatives from Teachers College who serve two-year terms; all senators are accorded full voting privileges regarding matters impacting the entire University. The president of Teachers College is a dean in the university's governance structure.

Housing

The college has three residence halls for single students. They are 517 West 121st, Grant Hall, and Whittier Hall. The college has three residence halls for family housing. They are Bancroft Hall, Grant Hall, and Sarasota Hall. One bedroom apartments are available for childless students and students who have one child. Two and three-bedroom apartments are available for students who have more than one child. Lowell Hall and Seth Low Hall have faculty housing units.

Publications 
The Teachers College Record has been published by the college continuously since 1900. In 1997 a group of doctoral students from Teachers College established the journal Current Issues in Comparative Education (CICE), a leading open-access online academic journal.

Teachers College Press, founded in 1904, is the national and international book publishing arm of Teachers College and is dedicated to deepening the understanding and improving the practice of education. Teachers College also publishes The Hechinger Report, a non-profit, non-partisan education news outlet focused on inequality and innovation in education that launched in May 2010.

Notable faculty

Current faculty

John Allegrante, Health and Behavior Studies
Charles Basch, Health Education
George Bonanno, Clinical Psychology
Peter T. Coleman, Social-Organizational Psychology and Conflict Resolution
Christopher Emdin, Science Education
Edmund W. Gordon, Psychology and Education
Neil R. Grabois, Mathematics Education
Joan Dye Gussow, Nutrition Education
Henry Landau, Mathematics Education
Arthur M. Langer, Professor of Professional Practice, Department of Organization and Leadership
Suniya Luthar, Psychology and Education
Elizabeth Midlarsky, Psychology and Education
Lisa Miller, Clinical Psychology
Kimberly G. Noble, Neuroscience and Education
Henry O. Pollak, Mathematics Education
Michael Rebell, Law and Educational Practice
Robert S. Siegler, Psychology and Education
Derald Wing Sue, Counseling Psychology
Barbara Tversky, Psychology and Education
Erica Walker, Mathematics and Education
Barbara C. Wallace, Clinical Psychology
Ruth Westheimer, Adjunct Professor, International and Transcultural Studies Department.

Past faculty

Eva Allen Alberti (1856-1938), dramatics teacher
Richard Thomas Alexander, founder of New College for the Education of Teachers
Allen E. Bergin, clinical psychologist
Elizabeth Burchinal, authority on American folk dance
Lambros Comitas, Applied Anthropology
Frank W. Cyr, father of the Yellow School Bus 
Morton Deutsch, social psychologist and founding father of the field of conflict resolution
John Dewey, philosopher
Arthur Wesley Dow, arts education
David F. Duncan, health education
Elizabeth E. Farrell, first president of the Council for Exceptional Children
Hamden L. Forkner, founder of Future Business Leaders of America
Elbert K. Fretwell, second Chief Scout Executive
Maxine Greene, philosopher of education
Linda Darling Hammond, founder of the National Center for Restructuring Education
Virginia Henderson, arguably the most famous nurse of the 20th century
Leta Stetter Hollingworth, psychology and education
 Adele T. Katz, Music
William Heard Kilpatrick, philosopher of education
Solon Kimball, anthropologist
Julius B. Maller, educational psychology
Charles J. Martin, arts instructor
Margaret Mead, anthropologist
Jack Mezirow, sociologist; former professor of adult and continuing education
Harold J. Noah, comparative education
Nel Noddings, philosopher of education
Mary Adelaide Nutting, nursing
Philip H. Phenix, philosopher of education 
Mary Swartz Rose, created nation's first program in nutrition
Harold Rugg, educational reformer
Julius Sachs, Education
Donna Shalala, former US Secretary of Health and Human Services
Douglas Sloan, professor of history of education; educational theorist; author
David Eugene Smith, professor of mathematics & mathematics education
Graeme Sullivan, art education
Edward Thorndike, psychologist
Robert L. Thorndike, psychologist
Clarence Hudson White, founding member of the Photo-Secession movement
Mary Schenck Woolman, pioneer in vocational education, one of the first two women on staff

Notable alumni 

Thelma C. Davidson Adair (M.A. 1945; Ed.D. 1959), advocate for human rights; peace; and justice 
Muhammad Fadhel al-Jamali (M.A. 1930; PhD 1934), Prime Minister of Iraq 
Pam Allyn (M.A. 1988), literacy expert 
Millie Almy (M.A. 1945, PhD 1948), psychologist and "Grandame of early childhood education"
Charles Alston (M.F.A. 1931), artist
Hafizullah Amin (M.A.), president of Afghanistan
Nahas Gideon Angula (M.A. 1978; Ed.M. 1979), Prime Minister of Namibia
Mary Antin (1902), immigration rights activist; author of The Promised Land 
Michael Apple (Ed.D. 1970), professor of educational policy studies
William Ayers (Ed.M.; Ed.D. 1987), founder of Weather Underground; professor of education
Carolyn Sherwin Bailey (1896), author of Miss Hickory winner of the 1947 Newbery Medal
Florence E. Bamberger (PhD 1922), pedagogue; school supervisor; progressive education advocate
Sarah Bavly (M.S. 1929; PhD 1947), Dutch-Israeli nutrition education pioneer in Israel
Louis T. Benezet (PhD 1942), former president of Claremont Graduate University
Sara Benincasa (M.A.), comedian and author
Randy E. Bennett (M.A. 1977; Ed.M., 1978; Ed.D. 1979), educational researcher
Josephine Thorndike Berry (B.S. 1904, A.M. 1910), American educator, home economist
C. Louise Boehringer (B.S. 1911), the first female to be elected to office in Arizona
Zhang Boling (1917), Chinese founder and president of National Nankai University 
Louie Croft Boyd (1909), nursing instructor
Barnett R. Brickner (M.A.), rabbi
Augusta Fox Bronner (B.S. 1906; M.A. 1909; PhD 1914), psychologist and co-director of the first child guidance clinic
John Seiler Brubacher (M.A.; PhD), educational philosopher; professor at Yale
Edith Buchanan (Ed.D. 1953), nursing educator, Professor & Principal, College of Nursing, (now Rajkumari Amrit Kaur College of Nursing) New Delhi, India
Paul G. Bulger (Ed.D. 1951), academic administrator
Peter L. Buttenwieser (PhD), American educator, fundraiser, member of the Lehman family
Donald Byrd (PhD 1982), jazz and fusion trumpet player; music educator
William Vincent Campbell Jr. (Ed.M. 1974), board director for Apple Inc.; CEO for Claris; Intuit Inc. and GO Corporation; chairman of the board of trustees of Columbia University
Betty Castor (1963), politician and president of the University of South Florida
P. C. Chang (PhD), philosopher and diplomat
Arthur W. Chickering (PhD 1958), educational researcher in student development theory
May Edward Chinn (B.S. 1921), first black woman to graduate from Bellevue Hospital Medical College 
Shirley Chisholm (M.A. 1952), first African American woman elected to Congress and former US presidential candidate
Carl Henry Clerk (PGDip. 1926), fourth synod clerk of the Presbyterian Church of the Gold Coast
Peter T. Coleman (PhD), psychologist; executive director of the Morton Deutsch ICCCR and the AC4
Satis N. Coleman (PhD 1931), music educator
Ennis Cosby (Ed.M. 1995), special education
Norman Cousins (B.A.), editor; peace activist
Margaret Mordecai Jones Cruikshank (1911), president of St. Mary's Junior College
Arthur Cunningham (M.A. 1957), composer
Frank W. Cyr (PhD 1930), educator and author
Bidhu Bhusan Das (M.A. 1947), public intellectual; professor; and ranking government official from India
Sarah Louise Delany (B.A. 1920; Ed.M. 1925), first African-American permitted to teach high school science in New York 
Ella Cara Deloria (B.S. 1915), Yankton Sioux ethnologist
Patricia DiMango (M.A.), judge; star of CBS’ Hot Bench created by Judge Judy
Diane DiResta (M.S. 1977), media trainer; speech coach; certified speech pathologist
Marjorie Housepian Dobkin (M.A.), author; Barnard College professor and dean
Aaron Douglas (M.A. 1944), painter; illustrator; visual arts educator; and major figure in the Harlem Renaissance
Patricia Lynne Duffy (M.A. 1981), synesthesia expert
 Edward C. Elliott (M.A.), educational researcher and president of Purdue University
Albert Ellis (M.A. 1943; PhD 1947), cognitive behavioral therapist
Blanche General Ely (M.A. 1923), principal and founder of multiple schools in Broward County, Florida
Claire Fagin (M.A.), first woman to serve as president of an Ivy League university
Abraham S. Fischler (Ed.D. 1959), academic; second president of Nova Southeastern University
Edward Fitzpatrick (B.S. 1906; M.A. 1907; PhD 1911), president of Mount Mary College
Rudolf Flesch (PhD 1955), Austrian-born American author; inspired Dr. Seuss to write The Cat in the Hat
William Patrick Foster (Ed.D. 1955), revolutionized college marching band technique
William Trufant Foster (PhD 1911), economist; first president of Reed College
Agnes Moore Fryberger, music educator
Susan Fuhrman (PhD 1977), first female president of TC; former UPenn dean 
Clarence Gaines (M.A. 1950), hall of fame basketball coach of Winston-Salem State University
Mildred García (Ed.D. 1987), president of the American Association of State Colleges and Universities (AASCU)
Art Garfunkel (M.A. 1967), singer (Rock and Roll Hall Of Fame inductee); poet; and actor
Gordon Gee (Ed.D. 1972), president of Ohio State University
Haim Ginott, child psychologist and psychotherapist and parent educator
Samuel E. Goldfarb, composer
Edmund W. Gordon (Ed.D.), psychologist 
Erick Gordon (Ed.M. 1992), founding director of the Student Press Initiative (SPI)
Betsy Gotbaum (M.A. 1967), American politician and activist
Joan Dye Gussow (Ed.D. 1975), professor; author; food policy expert; environmentalist; gardener
Margaret H'Doubler (1916), dance education
Martin Haberman (Ed.D. 1962), academic
Tsuruko Haraguchi (PhD 1912), psychologist
Anna Mae Hays (B.S. 1958), first woman in the U.S. Armed Forces to be promoted to a general officer rank
Virginia Henderson (B.S. 1932; M.A. 1934), nurse; researcher; theorist; the "first lady of nursing"
Martha Hill (B.S. 1929), first director of dance at the Juilliard School 
Andy Holt (PhD 1937), president of University of Tennessee
Lois Holzman (PhD 1977), director and co-founder of the East Side Institute
Olivia Hooker (M.A. 1947), first African-American woman to serve in the U.S. Coast Guard
Lee Huan (M.A.), premier of the Republic of China
Percy Hughes (M.A.; PhD), philosopher; teacher
Seymour Itzkoff (PhD 1965), professor emeritus of education and child study at Smith College
George Ivany (M.A. 1962), president of the University of Saskatchewan
Kevin Jennings (M.A. 1994), former assistant deputy secretary at the U.S. Department of Education
David W. Johnson (Ed.D. 1966), social psychologist
Hazel Johnson-Brown (M.A. 1963), first female African-American general in the United States Army
Dock J. Jordan (A.B., 1925; M.A. 1928), civil rights leader, educator, lawyer, president of Edward Waters University and Kittrell College
Yoshi Kasuya (M.A. 1930, PhD 1933), Japanese educator
Thomas Kean (M.A. 1963), former governor of New Jersey
John D. Kendall (M.A.), leader in bringing the Suzuki Method to the US
Deborah Kenny (PhD 1994), CEO of Harlem Village Academies
Maude Kerns (M.A. 1906), pioneering abstract artist and teacher
William Heard Kilpatrick (PhD 1912), philosopher of education; successor of John Dewey
Imogene King (Ed.D.), pioneer of nursing theory development
John King Jr. (Ed.M.; Ed.D. 2008), 10th United States secretary of education
Herbert Kliebard (Ed.D. 1963), historian of education 
Ellie Krieger (M.S. 1994), nutritionist; host of Healthy Appetite with Ellie Krieger on Food Network and Ellie's Real Good Food on PBS 
Eleanor C. Lambertsen (B.S. 1949; M.A. 1950; Ed.D. 1957), revolutionized nursing and health care organization and delivery
H. S. S. Lawrence (M.A.; Ed.D. 1950), Indian educationist
Maya Lawrence (M.A. 2010), Olympic fencer 
J. Paul Leonard (1901–1995), American university president, educator 
Harriet Lerner (M.A.), clinical psychologist
Eda LeShan (B.S. 1944), writer; television host; counselor; educator; playwright
Mosei Lin (PhD 1929), Taiwanese academic and educator; first Taiwanese to receive a PhD degree
Guillermo Linares (Ed.D.), first Dominican elected to public office in the US
Mort Lindsey (M.A. 1948; Ed.D. 1974), orchestrator; composer; pianist; conductor; musical director
George Albert Llano (M.A. 1939), Cuban-born American polar explorer and lichenologist
Ruth Lubic (B.S. 1959; M.A. 1961; Ed.D. 1979), leader of the nurse-midwifery movement in the US
Sid Luckman, quarterback in the Pro Football Hall of Fame
Ryah Ludins (B.S. 1921; artist and art teacher
Julius B. Maller (PhD 1929), educator and sociologist
Agnes Martin (B.A. 1942), artist 
Rollo May (PhD 1949), existential psychologist
John C. McAdams (M.A.), associate professor of political science at Marquette University
Jane Ellen McAllister (PhD 1929), first African American woman to earn a PhD in education in the United States
Margaret McFarland (PhD 1938), child psychologist, chief consultant to Mister Rogers' Neighborhood
Morris Meister (PhD 1921), first principal of The Bronx High School of Science, and the first president of The Bronx Community College
Olga A. Mendez (M.A. 1960), first Puerto Rican woman elected to a US state legislature 
Jiang Menglin (PhD), president of Peking University; minister of education for the Republic of China
Chester Earl Merrow (1937), educator; U.S. Representative from New Hampshire
Yvonne B. Miller (M.A. 1962), first African-American woman to be elected to the Virginia state house
Richard P. Mills (Ed.D. 1977), former commissioner of education for Vermont and New York
Belle Moskowitz (attended in 1894)
Jerome T. Murphy (M.A.), dean emeritus at the Harvard Graduate School of Education
Georgia O'Keeffe (1914), artist
Raphael Montañez Ortiz (Ed.D. 1982), founder of El Museo del Barrio
Annie-B Parson (M.A. 1983), dancer, choreographer, founder of Big Dance Theater
Hildegard Peplau (M.A.; PhD), nurse and nurse theorist who led the way towards the humane treatment of patients with behavior and personality disorders
Regina Peruggi (Ed.D. 1984), educator
Esther Peterson (M.A. 1930), consumer rights activist; 1981 Presidential Medal of Freedom recipient 
Kuo Ping-Wen (M.A. 1912; PhD 1914), Chinese educator
Anita Pollitzer (1913), suffragette and national chairman of the NWP
Thomas S. Popkewitz (M.A. 1964), professor of curriculum theory at the University of Wisconsin-Madison
Neil Postman (M.A. 1955; Ed.D. 1958), cultural critic
 Louise M. Powell (B.S. 1922), nurse and educator who led the University of Minnesota School of Nursing during its formative years.
Caroline Pratt (B.A. 1894), progressive educator; founder of City and Country School
Soon-Yi Previn (Ed.M.), special education 
Thomas Granville Pullen Jr. (Ed.M.; Ed.D. 1926), president University of Baltimore; Maryland State Superintendent of Education
David Randolph (M.A. 1942), conductor; music educator; radio host
Robert Bruce Raup (PhD 1926), philosophy of education professor emeritus and critic of the American education system
Diane Ravitch (PhD 1975), historian of education; former U.S. Assistant secretary of education
Betty Reardon (Ed.D. 1985), founder and director of the Peace Education Center 
Helen Reichert (M.A. 1931), talk show personality; professor 
June Reinisch (M.A. 1970; PhD 1976), psychologist and director of the Kinsey Institute
Richard Robinson (attended, 1963), former CEO of Scholastic Corporation
Henrietta Rodman (1904), teacher; feminist activist
Agnes L. Rogers (PhD 1917), educational psychologist; professor of education
Carl Rogers (M.A. 1928; PhD 1931), psychologist
Martha E. Rogers (M.A. 1945), nursing theorist; creator of the Science of Unitary Human Beings
Marvin Rosen (Ed.M.; Ed.D.), pianist; educator; musicologist; Classical Discoveries radio host
Miriam Roth (Ed.M.), Israeli writer and scholar of children's books; educator
Adolph Rupp (M.A.), hall of fame basketball coach of the University of Kentucky
Juanita Jane Saddler (M.A. 1935), dean of women at Fisk University
Angela Santomero (M.A.), television executive producer and creator 
Morton Schindel (M.A. 1947), educator and film producer
William Schuman (B.S. 1935; M.A. 1937), former president of the Juilliard School of Music and the Lincoln Center for the Performing Arts
Jill Sheffield (M.A. 1963), women's reproductive rights advocate
Robert Sherman (M.A. 1953), radio broadcaster; author; educator
Tian-Ming Sheu (Ed.D. 1993), president of the National Academy for Educational Research in Taiwan
Frank Shifreen (2001), artist; curator; teacher
Hu Shih (PhD 1917), Chinese philosopher; essayist; and diplomat
Irma Salas Silva (PhD 1930), Chilean educator
Rawley Silver (Ed.D. 1936), art therapist
Lucy Diggs Slowe (M.A. 1915), first black woman to serve as Dean of Women at an American University; one of the original founders and first president of Alpha Kappa Alpha
Ian K. Smith (M.A. 1993), physician and author; appears on VH1's Celebrity Fit Club series; The View; NBC News; and HealthWatch with Dr. Ian Smith
Karl Struss (B.A. 1912), photographer and cinematographer; pioneer in 3D films
Elaine Sturtevant (M.A.), artist
Leon Sullivan (M.A. 1947), civil rights leader and social activist; 1991 Presidential Medal of Freedom recipient
Ruth C. Sullivan (M.A. 1953), autism activist
Bobby Susser (M.A. 1987), children's songwriter; record producer; performer
Marius Sznajderman
Hilda Taba (PhD 1932), architect; curriculum theorist; curriculum reformer and teacher educator
Alma Thomas (M.A. 1934), expressionist painter and art educator 
Ellen R. Thompson (M.A.) composer and music educator 
Edward Thorndike (PhD 1898), psychologist
Robert L. Thorndike (M.A. 1932; PhD 1935), psychologist
Merryl Tisch (Ed.D.), chancellor of the New York State Board of Regents
Samuel Totten (Ed.D. 1985), genocide scholar
Minnie Vautrin (M.A. 1919), educator and missionary
Marion Verhaalen, (Ed.D., 1971) composer and musicologist
Lynd Ward (1926), artist and storyteller
 Moshe Weinberger, rabbi and author
Joel Westheimer, professor of citizenship education at the University of Ottawa
Ruth Westheimer (Ed.D. 1970), sex therapist known as "Dr. Ruth", German-American, also talk show host, author, professor, Holocaust survivor, and former Haganah sniper.
Floyd Wilcox (M.A. 1920), third president of Shimer College
John Davis Williams (Ed.D. 1940), chancellor of the University of Mississippi
Henry Wittenberg (M.A.), Olympic wrestling champion
Carmen Rita Wong (M.A. 2000), personal finance expert; former host of On the Money on CNBC
Deborah Wolfe (M.S. 1938; Ed.D. 1945), Education Chief of the US House of Representatives Committee on Education and Labor
Marion Thompson Wright (PhD 1940), first African-American woman in the United States to earn PhD in History
Tao Xingzhi (1917), Chinese educator and political activist
Darlene Yee-Melichar (M.S. 1984; Ed.D. 1985), gerontologist
Anzia Yezierska (1905), Polish-born American novelist
Shirley Zussman (1937), German-born American sex therapist

See also

Japan Campus of Foreign Universities

References

External links

 

Educational institutions established in 1887
Columbia University
Schools of education in New York (state)
Upper West Side
1887 establishments in New York (state)